Oxyspora is a genus of flowering plants belonging to the family Melastomataceae.

Its native range is Tropical and Subtropical Asia.

Species:

Oxyspora acutangula 
Oxyspora auriculata 
Oxyspora balansae 
Oxyspora beccarii 
Oxyspora bullata 
Oxyspora cernua 
Oxyspora cordata 
Oxyspora curtisii 
Oxyspora exigua 
Oxyspora floribunda 
Oxyspora hirta 
Oxyspora hispida 
Oxyspora howellii 
Oxyspora longisetosa 
Oxyspora macrophylla 
Oxyspora microflora 
Oxyspora ovata 
Oxyspora paniculata 
Oxyspora racemosa 
Oxyspora sagittata 
Oxyspora scabrida 
Oxyspora senguptae 
Oxyspora stellulata 
Oxyspora sublepidota 
Oxyspora sumatrana 
Oxyspora teretipetiolata 
Oxyspora umbellata 
Oxyspora urophylla 
Oxyspora vagans 
Oxyspora wrayi 
Oxyspora yunnanensis

References

Melastomataceae
Melastomataceae genera